For someone needs Love is an album by Shunichi Miyamoto released March 24, 2005.  Its catalog number is VICL-61597.

Track list
 海の子守歌 - (Umi No Komoriuta)
 眠れない夜を越えて - (Nemurenai Yoru Wo Koete)
 Everytime I Miss You
 最後のkiss - (Saigo No Kiss)
 うそつき - (Usotsuki)
 虹色マスカラ - (Nijiiro Masukara)
 Happy Birthday to you
 ＜Yes, my love＞
 永遠（live version） - (Eien (Live Version))
 出会う前のように - (Deau Mae No Youni)

2005 albums